Marcel Van Minh Phuc Long Nguyen (born 8 September 1987) is a retired German artistic gymnast and three-time Olympian, having represented Germany at the 2008, 2012, and 2016 Olympic Games.  He is the 2012 Olympic silver medalist in the all-around and on parallel bars as well as the 2011 and 2012 European Champion on the latter. He has been a soldier in the Bundeswehr (German military) since July 2007, beginning when he was training in the Bundeswehr Sports Development Group (Sportfördergruppe der Bundeswehr) in Munich.

Early life
Nguyen was born in Munich, West Germany, in 1987 to a German mother and a Central Vietnamese father. He has one sister.

Sporting career
Nguyen began gymnastics at the age of four, and at seven years of age, joined TSV Unterhaching. Since 1995, he has trained at the regional training center in Munich. Since 1997, Nguyen was part of the squad perspective, where Andreas Hirsch and Jens Milbradt were his coaches. He rose quickly from the D- to B-squad. Since 2002, he has started for the Junior National Team.

2005–2007
In 2005, Nguyen was the German junior champion on parallel bars, runner-up on rings and third in the vault. That same year he took part in the World Championships in Melbourne for the first time. During qualifications he placed 16th on parallel bars but did not qualify to the event finals. After the World Cup, Nguyen spent a year at the sports boarding school in Stuttgart in order to prepare with his teammates under the coaches Anatoli Jarmovski and Klaus Nigl for the 2006 World Championships in Aarhus. Nguyen competed at the 2006 World Artistic Gymnastics Championships where he helped Germany finish seventh in the team final.

In 2007 Nguyen competed at the 2007 World Artistic Gymnastics Championships where he helped Germany win the team bronze medal.

2008
Nguyen competed at the Beijing Olympics where he helped Germany place fourth in the team final.  Individually he did not qualify to any event finals.

2009–2011
In 2009 Marcel finished second in the Champions Trophy and the German Championship. This was followed by winning the title in the German National league with KTV Straubenhard.

In 2010, Nguyen competed at the 2010 European Men's Artistic Gymnastics Championships where he helped Germany win team gold. Individually he won bronze on floor exercise and placed sixth on vault and still rings. Later that year he broke the fibula in his right leg at a friendly meet between Germany, Switzerland, and Romania.

In 2011 Nguyen competed at the 2011 European Artistic Gymnastics Championships.  He won the gold medal on parallel bars, making him the first gymnast to have won since 1955. He later competed at the 2011 World Artistic Gymnastics Championships where he helped Germany place sixth in the team final and individually he placed eighth in the all-around.

2012–2015
In the 2012 London Olympic Games, Nguyen won two Olympic silver medals after competing in the Men's artistic team all-around, individual all-around, floor and parallel bars. Nguyen collected the first all-around gymnastics medal for Germany since the 1936 Summer Olympic Games held in Berlin. His second silver medal was on the individual apparatus final of parallel bars, and the German team all-around finished in 7th place. Lastly, he finished in 8th place on the floor individual apparatus final, an event, for which he had little time to prepare and initially not qualified but was brought as first reserve last minute to complete the roster of the event final, after another athlete who had qualified for the final withdrew due to injury. At the European Championships in 2014, he placed 4th on the team, but failed to qualify for any of the individual finals. In September 2014, he was at the home championships in Stuttgart on parallel bars and rings which is where he tore his ACL.

After his ACL injury, Nguyen celebrated his comeback at German national championships in Giessen, where he was qualified to take part at the World Championships 2015 in Glasgow. Although the German team was not directly qualified for the Olympic Games 2016, Nguyen participated at the Test Event of Olympic Games in April 2016. The German team won that round and got the right to participate in the Olympics. The last events before the Olympic Games were quite successful for Nguyen – the bronze medal on the parallel bars with 15,566 at the European Championships in Bern and gold at the German national championships at the rings. That was the 7th title of Nguyen at this apparatus. For the first time since 2009, he did not win the gold medal on the parallel bar and stayed second behind his teammate Lukas Dauser. This caused the second ranking in the overall competition as well but saved the nomination to represent Germany in the Olympic Games 2016.

2016
Olympic Games 2016 brought Nguyen and his team the 7th place in overall teams ranking. During his routine on parallel bars, the new element was shown – "The Nguyen" is added to the Code of points (with a grade "E" which is higher as average) and brings 0.5 points to the athlete who completes it without mistake.

2017
In March Nguyen competed at the Doha World Cup where he placed second on parallel bars behind Zou Jingyuan of China and placed sixth on still rings.  He later competed at the 2017 European Championships and placed sixth on the parallel bars.

In September he competed at the Paris Challenge Cup where he placed fourth on parallel bars.  In October Nguyen competed at the 2017 World Championships in Montreal and placed seventh on the parallel bars with a score of 14.700.

Following the World Championships he competed at the Arthur Gander Memorial where he won silver behind Oleg Verniaiev of the Ukraine and placed fifth at the Swiss Cup where he was partnered with Elisabeth Seitz. Nguyen finished his season at the Cottbus World Cup where he won bronze on parallel bars and placed fifth on still rings.

2018
In March Nguyen competed at the Stuttgart World Cup where he placed sixth.  In August he represented Germany at the European Championships where he qualified to the floor exercise and rings event finals.  He finished sixth on each.  Additionally he helped Germany finish fourth as a team.  The following month Nguyen competed at the German National Championships where he placed first in the all-around ahead of Andreas Toba.

Nguyen was selected to represent Germany at the 2018 World Championships in Doha, Qatar.  As a team Germany finished tenth in qualifications and were the second reserve.  Individually Nguyen qualified to the all-around final.  During the final he finished 20th.  Nguyen later competed at the Arthur Gander Memorial where he finished first in the 4-event all-around.  He next competed at the Swiss Cup where he was partnered with Elisabeth Seitz; together they finished first ahead of the Russian duo of Angelina Melnikova and Nikita Nagornyy.  Nguyen ended the season competing at the Cottbus World Cup where he finished fifth on both floor exercise and parallel bars.

2019 
Nguyen was scheduled to compete at the American Cup but withdrew due to injury.  After he recovered he competed at the Stuttgart World Cup where he finished fourth behind Artur Dalaloyan, Sun Wei, and Petro Pakhniuk. Nguyen competed at the European Championships in April where he was the first reserve for the parallel bars.  At the German National Championships Nguyen finished second in the all-around behind Andreas Toba but finished first on floor exercise and parallel bars.  Additionally he finished third on high bar and rings.  Nguyen was selected to represent Germany at the 2019 World Championships; however he tore a tendon in his shoulder and had to withdraw.

2021 
In May Nguyen tore a cruciate ligament in his right knee which ended his bid to compete at the upcoming Olympic Games in Tokyo.

2022–23 
Nguyen returned to competition in May and competed at the 2022 Varna Challenge Cup.  He qualified to the rings, parallel bars, and horizontal bar finals.

On 14 March 2023 Nguyen announced his retirement from the sport.

Competitive history

References

External links
 
 
 
 
 
 "Marcel Nguyen collected the first all-round gymnastics medal for Germany since 1936 when he took silver...", thelocal.de; accessed 9 September 2016.
 Profile, stuttgarter-zeitung.de; accessed 9 September 2016. 

German male artistic gymnasts
1987 births
Living people
Olympic gymnasts of Germany
Gymnasts at the 2008 Summer Olympics
Gymnasts at the 2012 Summer Olympics
Gymnasts at the 2016 Summer Olympics
German people of Vietnamese descent
Sportspeople from Munich
Sportspeople of Vietnamese descent
Olympic silver medalists for Germany
Olympic medalists in gymnastics
Medalists at the 2012 Summer Olympics
Medalists at the World Artistic Gymnastics Championships
European champions in gymnastics
Originators of elements in artistic gymnastics
20th-century German people
21st-century German people